= Football Federation of Burundi =

Governing body of football in Burundi

CAF
- Founded: 1962
- Headquarters: Bujumbura
- FIFA affiliation: 1972
- CAF affiliation: 1972
- President: (Burundi) Alexandre Muyenge
- Website: http://www.ffb.bi

The Football Federation of Burundi (French: Fédération de football du Burundi, FFB) is the governing body of football in Burundi. It was founded in 1962, affiliated to FIFA in 1972 and to CAF in 1972. It organizes the national football league and the national team.
